Jubing  was a village development committee in Solukhumbu District in the Sagarmatha Zone of north-eastern Nepal. It was divided and merged into two new formed Rural municipality in 2017 when the old administrative structures were reconstructed. Ward no. 2, 3, 4 and 6 were incorporated with Dudhkoshi rural municipality and remaining all wards 1, 5, 7, 8 and 9 were incorporated with Khumbu Pasanglhamu rural municipality.

At the time of the 1991 Nepal census it had a population of 2704 people living in 550 individual households.

References

External links
UN map of the municipalities of Solukhumbu District

Populated places in Solukhumbu District
Khumbu Pasanglhamu